Frédérique Bredin (born 2 November 1956) is a French politician who used to serve as president of the National Center of Cinematography and the moving image (CNC). Born in Paris, Bredin graduated from the Paris Institute of Political Studies, as well as the École nationale d'administration, graduating in 1980 alongside fellow French Socialist Party (PS) politicians François Hollande, Michel Sapin, and Ségolène Royal.

Bredin began her political career serving under Jack Lang during his time as Culture Minister of France, then in 1986 became cultural advisor to President François Mitterrand. She ran in the 1988 legislative election out of a constituency in Seine-Maritime. She won election to the National Assembly, and at 31 years of age she was the youngest member of the Assembly at that time. In 1989, Bredin was elected mayor of Fécamp, and on 16 May 1991 she was named Minister of Youth Affairs and Sports. She held that position until 29 March 1993, when the PS was removed from power.

In the 1994 European Parliament elections, the PS won 15 seats; Bredin was awarded one of them, and served until 1996. In 1995, she was named national secretary for the PS, with her role placing an emphasis on culture and communication; she served in that role until 2000. After her term ended, she retired from politics and got a job at the Lagardère Active. In 2013, Bredin was named president of the CNC, and was reappointed to the same position in 2016.

Her father, Jean-Denis Bredin, was an attorney who was the founder of the law firm Bredin Prat.

References

1956 births
Living people
Politicians from Paris
Socialist Party (France) politicians
Women government ministers of France
Women members of the National Assembly (France)
Mayors of places in Normandy
Sciences Po alumni
École nationale d'administration alumni
Inspection générale des finances (France)